Pale Fire is the fifth studio album by El Perro Del Mar released on 13 November 2012 on Memphis Industries, The Control Group and INGRID.

Critical reception
The album received positive to mixed reviews. Kevin Leidel of Slant Magazine called it "one of the most beguiling and unique offerings of the Swedish pack" saying Assbring "consistently displays a steady hand with her experimentation". Prefix praised "effortless knack for poetic personification", referring to 'I Was a Boy' a "humbling, devastating, quiet pop ballad". Pitchfork while generally positive, expressed disappointment in light of the 2011 release 'What Do You Expect', stating, "the idea of a dance album from El Perro Del Mar is tantalizing: tears on the floor and a thick, moody fog in the air, as apt for dancing as for watching shadows".

Track listing

 "Pale Fire"
 "Hold Off the Dawn"
 "Home Is to Feel Like That"
 "I Carry the Fire"
 "Love Confusion"
 "Walk on By"
 "Love in Vain"
 "To the Beat of a Dying World"
 "I Was a Boy"
 "Dark Night"

Charts

Tour

References

El Perro del Mar albums
2012 albums
Ingrid (record label) albums